Antaboga is the world serpent of traditional pre-Islamic Javanese mythology (before the era of Demak kingdom). It is a derivative from Shiva-Hinduism Ananta Shesha combined with Javanism. After the fall of the kingdom of Majapahit and the ascent of Islam in Java, the centre for Hinduism shifted to Bali.
These days many of the old myths and legends are celebrated in the wayang performance that became a vehicle to combine the syncretic philosophies from outside with those philosophies and ideas already rooted within the local cultures and traditions.

At the beginning of time, only Antaboga existed. Antaboga meditated and created the world turtle Bedawang from which all other creations sprang. According to Sundanese myth, Antaboga was also responsible for the birth of Dewi Sri, the rice goddess of Java and Bali. According to "Wawacan Sulanjana", Dewi Sri emerges from the tears that turned into an egg, shed by Antaboga.

Etymology
The name Antaboga derived from the Sanskrit term ananta (endless) and boga (food, possession or wealth). As resulting, Antaboga could be translated as "endless food" or "endless wealth".

Notes

Javanese mythology
Legendary serpents
Nāgas
World-bearing animals